Bipunctiphorus pelzi is a moth of the family Pterophoridae. It is known from Ecuador.

The wingspan is 15–16 mm. Adults are on wing in June, September and December.

External links

Platyptiliini
Moths described in 2002
Taxa named by Cees Gielis